Heffer Steer-Wolfe is a fictional character on the animated television series Rocko's Modern Life and the comic book series of the same name. Tom Kenny provided the voice of the anthropomorphic steer.

Conception and development
Joe Murray, creator of Rocko's Modern Life, partially based Heffer on an adopted friend who enjoyed bologna sandwiches and "had an interesting take on life." Heffer first appeared on an ID spot aired on MTV in 1989; the ID spot depicts Heffer as flying out of a television with the MTV logo branded on his buttocks.

Murray originally wrote "Sucker for the Suck-O-Matic" as the pilot episode; the executives decided that Heffer would be "a little too weird for test audiences." Murray, instead of removing Heffer from "Sucker for the Suck-O-Matic," decided to write "Trash-O-Madness," an episode without Heffer, as the pilot episode. Originally, Murray did not include any information about Heffer's origins in his pitch to Nickelodeon. Vince Calandra wrote the Heffer's origin plotline in Season 1.

Murray auditioned Tom Kenny in a large casting call in Los Angeles and chose him as the voice actor for Heffer. Kenny based Heffer's voice on the voice of a nephew of his; at the time the nephew was a teenager. The boy, who was 13 when the Heffer voice started, was the son of Kenny's brother. Kenny said that the voice was "[n]ot dead on, but some of his quirks I incorporated into the Heffer audition."

Jeff "Swampy" Marsh, a storyboard writer, says that Heffer's right eye and left nostril are "notched at the bottom" due to Murray's design style. Marsh added that the animators found keeping the sides straight "a little tricky at first" and that they referred to the design as "Tombstone-shaped."

Character
Best friend of Rocko, Heffer was raised by wolves in O-Town who fattened him up to eat him. Eventually the family grew to love Heffer, so they instead raised him, not letting him know that he was adopted until Rocko accidentally revealed the truth when the Wolfe family invited him for dinner. The mark which Heffer believed to be a "birthmark" on his buttocks is actually the plotting lines showing where the wolves were going to divide him.

The Nickelodeon UK page describes Heffer as a "devoted friend" who "loves life." Heffer's lack of fear mostly stems from stupidity instead of genuine bravery. The Nickelodeon South East Asia website describes him as an "overgrown slob." Despite being obese, he can drive; unlike Rocko he does not wear seat belts, mostly because the seat belts do not extend enough for him to wear them comfortably. Also he seems to be a hopeless romantic at times as mentioned in "Sugar Frosted Frights," where he asks Filburt's shell while in an eight-ball mode if he will ever find true love.

Heffer holds several jobs: tree farmer, greenskeeper at a golf course, mail carrier, security guard, waiter at a café, and cashier. Despite his size, he can be very nimble at times, most notably when he is roller-skating. At the local skating rink, he is known as "The King," and performs his own skating routine at the request of the patrons.

Heffer's biological father lives with a girl cow named Joyce in a trailer in the Canoga Park section of the San Fernando Valley region of Los Angeles. A shaved and elderly version of Heffer makes a cameo appearance in the series finale of Murray's other show, Camp Lazlo, as the real scoutmaster. The normal version (animated by Dan Sills) also appears in the alternate ending.

References

External links

TVARK MTV Europe - Contains original MTV ID Spot (click on Ident-Tribal)

Adoptee characters in television
Television characters introduced in 1989
Orphan characters in television
Rocko's Modern Life characters
Fictional cattle
Male characters in animated series